Windows Media is a discontinued multimedia framework for media creation and distribution for Microsoft Windows. It consists of a software development kit (SDK) with several application programming interfaces (API) and a number of prebuilt technologies, and is the replacement of NetShow technologies.

The Windows Media SDK was replaced by Media Foundation when Windows Vista was released.

Software
Windows Media Center
Windows Media Player
Windows Media Encoder 
Windows Media Services
Windows Movie Maker

Formats
Advanced Systems Format (ASF)
Advanced Stream Redirector (ASX)
Windows Media Audio (WMA)
Windows Media Playlist (WPL)
Windows Media Video (WMV) and VC-1
Windows Media Station (NSC)
WMV HD, (Windows Media Video High Definition), the branding name for high definition (HD) media content encoded using Windows Media codecs. WMV HD is not a separate codec.
HD Photo (formerly Windows Media Photo, standardized as JPEG XR)
DVR-MS, the recording format used by Windows Media Center
SAMI, the closed caption format developed by Microsoft. It can be used to synchronize captions and audio descriptions with online video.

Protocols
Media Stream Broadcast (MSB), for multicast distribution of Advanced Systems Format content over a network
Media Transfer Protocol (MTP), for transferring and synchronizing media on portable devices
Microsoft Media Services (MMS), the streaming transport protocol
Windows Media DRM, an implementation of digital rights management

Website
WindowsMedia.com

See also 
QuickTime - Apple Computer's multimedia framework
Silverlight

External links
 Official website
 Description of the algorithm used for WMA encryption

Microsoft Windows multimedia technology
Multimedia frameworks
Discontinued Microsoft software